Acatepec  is one of the 81 municipalities of Guerrero, in south-western Mexico. The municipal seat lies at Acatepec.  The municipality covers an area of 599 km².

In 2010, the municipality had a total population of 32,792, up from 28,525 in 2005.

References

Municipalities of Guerrero